Samhwa Networks is a Korean drama production company. Founded in 1980 by Shin Hyun-taek as a home video distributor, it later became well-known because of its drama productions.

As of 2019, Shin's family (including his eldest son and son-in-law, who are the co-CEO's of the company) owns 38.71% of its stocks. The rest are owned by the public.

List of works

Notes

References

External links
  

Mass media companies established in 1980
Television production companies of South Korea
Companies based in Seoul
Companies listed on KOSDAQ
South Korean companies established in 1980